"Lemon" is a song by American band N.E.R.D. from their fifth studio album, No One Ever Really Dies (2017). The song features vocals from Barbadian singer Rihanna, and was released as the album's lead single on November 1, 2017.

Former Pennsylvania U.S. Senator Arlen Specter is sampled in the song as the man saying "wait a minute."

Several alternate versions of the songs were produced, including a version without the Rihanna feature (which sees Pharrell rapping a similar verse), a radio edit, and an edited version submitted to streaming services that omits Pharrell's first verse. The remix featuring Drake was released on March 17, 2018.

Music video
The music video for "Lemon" was uploaded to N.E.R.D.'s Vevo page on YouTube on November 1, 2017. The video was directed by Todd Tourso and Scott Cudmore, and produced by Stacey Thiel and stars dancer Mette Towley.

Track listing

Charts

Weekly charts

Year-end charts

Certifications

Release history

Drake remix

The official remix, titled the "Drake Remix", featuring Canadian rapper and singer Drake was premiered on Episode 58 of OVO Sound Radio and made available for purchase on March 17, 2018.

Chart performance
The remix charted on RMNZ's New Zealand chart, peaking at number 37.

Track listing

Charts

Certifications

Release history

References

2017 singles
2017 songs
Columbia Records singles
N.E.R.D. songs
Rihanna songs
Song recordings produced by Kuk Harrell
Song recordings produced by Pharrell Williams
Songs written by Pharrell Williams
Songs written by Rihanna